Most countries' amateur radio licences allow licensed operators to install and use radio transmission equipment while at sea.  Such operation is known as maritime mobile amateur radio.  In most cases the operator's call sign needs to be extended by adding the suffix "/MM" when transmitting at sea.

Licensing

The following notes are made with regard to the UK "Full" amateur radio licence terms, provisions and limitations, and so may vary slightly from other amateur licences.

Maritime mobile operation is defined as operating a transmitter that is located on any vessel at sea. This means any manned structure afloat outside of the high-water mark. Operating on vessels on inland waterways is defined as mobile working, and so requires /M to be added to the callsign, not /MM as for maritime mobile operation.

There is a requirement that the amateur radio equipment must only be installed with the written permission of the vessel's master. This does not affect those who intend to install a transceiver on their own boat, but is relevant to anyone who intends to make transmissions from a ferry or other passenger ship. In such cases, the master of the ship has the right to demand radio silence from the amateur operator. There is no requirement to keep a log of calls, but a written record of information about frequencies, times, operators and their callsigns can be valuable.

It is not a requirement that the station transmits its location, but of course this is advisable, and easy to do with on-board GPS location. UK amateurs have a system of regional secondary locators that they must use within UK territorial waters (e.g. adding D for Isle of Man, M for Scotland etc. in the second position in their callsign). In international waters, this is not necessary. When in the territorial waters of other countries, CEPT rules apply and these can get complex. The normal procedure is to prepend the national locator of the host country to the normal callsign, separated with another slash. So, amateur station A0AA, operating from a vessel within the territorial tidal waters of a country identified by the prefix B would identify itself as B/A0AA/MM when transmitting.

In international waters, amateur licensees must only use frequency bands allocated internationally in each of the three ITU Regions.  In any country's territorial waters, they should abide by the frequency allocations and bandplans applicable to the host country.

Maritime Mobile Nets 
Many long-standing and sophisticated radio nets are regularly operated by shore-based amateur volunteers for seafaring operators.

Technical considerations 
There are some special considerations when installing and using amateur radio transmitters and receivers afloat.  These include power supply, RF earthing, antenna design and EMC (electromagnetic compatibility) with other electronic equipment aboard.

Antenna design and installation 
For MF and HF use, the most common antenna design is to add two RF insulators into the backstay of the mast and feed it from the transceiver using a sintered bronze earthing plate, bolted to the outside of the hull, well under the waterline, as an earth.  On metal hulled boats the earthing plate can be dispensed with, and the whole hull used as a ground.  In this case, the thickness of any paint layer is entirely negligible at RF. On a yacht with twin backstays, if insulators are placed in both of them and they are fed from the masthead, they may be usable as an "inverted vee" avoiding the need to feed the antenna against ground. Either format will require the use of an ATU (Antenna Tuning Unit) to achieve resonance for the HF frequency in use, as the physical length of the antenna will almost invariably be incorrect at the frequency of choice. A few twin-masted sailing vessels have the space to erect a "Tee" antenna or an inverted "L" between masts. These antenna configurations are more common on merchant ships.

For VHF and UHF operation, one option is to mount a small yagi antenna to a pole 1–2 m (3–6 ft) long and haul this to the masthead using a flag halyard.  If the halyard is correctly knotted to the middle and bottom of the pole, it is easy enough to make the antenna project above the clutter at the masthead into clear air.  The problem is in rotating it - it usually needs to be lowered and re-raised to alter the direction of its beam.  For the safety of masthead fittings and lights it is better if these yagis are light in weight and made largely of, for example, plastic tubes supporting internal wire conductors.  Operating in this way is best reserved for when in harbour or at anchor, to avoid interfering with the operation of the boat.  Repeated loss of signal due to rolling and pitching would make it impractical for useful communication at sea anyway.

For FM operation on the 2 m band, the masthead vertical whip that is normally installed for marine VHF operation will provide good omni-directional, vertically polarised signals.  The frequency of operation around 145 MHz is close enough to the antenna's design frequency of 156 MHz that most amateur transceivers will not need an ATU and will not suffer unduly from a poor (high) SWR.

Earthing 

For a single-ended HF antenna, a good electrical earth connection is essential. It is also necessary from the points of view of safety and EMC considerations on any radio transmitter installation on a boat or ship. As mentioned above, metal-hulled vessels have a natural advantage in that, especially at HF and lower frequencies, the hull can be considered to be in contact with the water, as the insulating properties of the paint layer against the water is a capacitance that presents very little electrical impedance to the RF currents. For fibreglass and wooden hulls and HF transmission, the usual solution is to attach a sintered bronze plate to the outside of the hull for RF earthing. The construction of a sintered bronze plate is porous to water so that although the plate may be only a square foot or two and an inch thick, the actual surface area of metal in electrical contact with the water is very many times that.

Once a good connection to the sea water has been established, it is necessary to make a good RF connection from the transceiver and ATU to the grounding system. While it might seem that a good, thick wire is all that is needed, for large RF currents it is usually recommended that copper grounding tape is used. This is not because thick wires will not be able to support the currents involved, but because it is more likely that RF currents will remain flowing along something that has a wide surface area without re-transmitting themselves along the way due to skin effect. The key pathway from the ATU of a single-ended antenna system to the earthing plate, or the hull earth-point, should be as short and as straight as possible. This should be considered from the start when deciding where to mount the various components within the hull. There is not much that the installer can do about the losses in, and the efficiencies of, the transceiver, the ATU, the antenna or its feed, but extra effort put into the efficiency of the earthing paths will pay much bigger dividends, in terms of radiated power and freedom from EMC problems later, than any other single aspect of the installation. The salty sea makes an exceptionally good ground plane, and effort put into achieving a good connection to it will be handsomely repaid.

Safety and EMC

A modern sailing boat, or any other modern seagoing craft, is a much more complex electronic environment than ever in the past, and even more so than a normal home-based amateur radio "shack". The vessel will probably have electronic navigation instruments, one or more GPS receivers, electronic automatic steering, domestic radio and perhaps television receivers as well as probably radar and VHF transmitters and receivers too. It may have various GMDSS devices too, such as a Navtex receiver and an AIS system. Many of these items are computerised and many of them are networked together with data, RF and power connections. All of this is crammed into a very compact, three-dimensional space and that space is shared by not only the radio operator, but perhaps several other crew or family members. Safety and EMC issues have never been so important.

One important fact to bear in mind is that the antenna lead, from the point where it leaves the relevant terminal on the HF ATU is a transmitting antenna. There is nothing that can or should be done to prevent RF radiation from this lead. It should be a specialist, high-voltage insulated, single-core wire and it should be rigidly mounted, well away from any other wiring, outside of any conducting faraday cage, in the shortest, straightest possible route to the point where it will connect to the external antenna, be that a whip or an insulated part of the standing rigging.

As discussed above, good earthing is essential in the installation of transmitting equipment, and good RF management will also pay dividends in terms of the ability to use other electronic equipment while transmitting, without damage to the other gear, or debilitating interference in the other gear during transmissions. It may be possible to disengage electronic steering and switch off or do without navigation instruments while the radio operator aboard makes a scheduled call, but others aboard will be much more grateful if this is not necessary and life aboard can continue as normal while people gather around the transceiver to hear news from ashore and from other boats, as well as weather or other important routing information.

See also 
 Amateur radio
 Marine and mobile radio telephony
 Satellite Internet access

References 

Amateur radio